Atlantic University is an American private non-profit distance education institution of higher and continuing education in Virginia Beach, Virginia. The university is associated with Edgar Cayce's Association for Research and Enlightenment (A.R.E.), and its administrative offices are in the Don and Nancy de Laski Education Center on the main A.R.E. campus. The university is nationally accredited by the Distance Education Accrediting Commission (DEAC), which is a member of the Council for Higher Education Accreditation (CHEA), for its distance education and hybrid programs. The university also maintains licensure with the State Council of Higher Education for Virginia (SCHEV).

History
Atlantic University received its charter on April 29, 1930, with a goal of offering a liberal arts education through a holistic perspective. The university closed in 1931, but the charter was kept active. In the fall semester of 1985, Atlantic University reopened as a graduate school with a curriculum that focused on Transpersonal Studies. The first class graduated in 1989.

Initially the Master of Arts in Transpersonal Studies was offered as a residential program with a few independent study distance education options via a correspondence course model. Over the years, the ratio of distance to residential courses changed until the majority of courses were taught as distance education. The method of instruction of distance courses also changed from a correspondence course model to web-based courses to courses on CD. In 2010, the conversion to a truly online school with three semesters began. As the university changed, continuing education and personal enrichment courses were added. In 2017, the university changed from three 14-week semesters to four 12-week semesters allowing for students to complete their program more efficiently. In recent years, the Master of Arts in Transpersonal Studies was changed to Master of Arts in Transpersonal Psychology, thus making the program more accessible and understandable to the outside public. In addition to the Transpersonal psychology degree, Atlantic University offers a Master of Arts in Mindful Leadership, a Graduate Certificate in Regression Hypnosis, a Graduate Certificate in Mindful Leadership, a non-credit certificate in Spiritual Guidance Mentor Training, and Lifelong Learning certificates to adult learners.

Programs
Master of Arts in Transpersonal Psychology with specializations in:
 General studies
 Applied spirituality
 Consciousness
 Creativity
 Leadership and Conflict Transformation
Master of Arts in Mindful Leadership

Other programs:
 Graduate Certificate in Integrated Imagery: Regression Hypnosis
 Graduate Certificate in Mindful Leadership
 Spiritual Guidance Mentor Training (non-credit certificate)
 Lifelong learning (non-credit)

References

External links
Official website
Association for Research and Enlightenment (A.R.E.)

Private universities and colleges in Virginia
Distance education institutions based in the United States
Distance Education Accreditation Commission
Educational institutions established in 1930
1930 establishments in Virginia
Education in Virginia Beach, Virginia